The Humffray River is a perennial river of the Mitchell River catchment, located in the Alpine region of the Australian state of Victoria.

Location and features
Formed by the confluence of the Humffray River West Branch and Humffray River East Branch, the Humffray River rises below the Tea Tree Range within the Great Dividing Range, northeast of the Wonnangatta River Reference Area and flows generally south by east, joined by one minor tributary before reaching its confluence with the Wonnangatta River in remote country below Little Baldy within the Alpine National Park in the Alpine Shire. The river descends  over its  course.

See also

 List of rivers in Australia

References

External links
 
 

East Gippsland catchment
Rivers of Gippsland (region)
Rivers of Hume (region)
Victorian Alps